Ice Airport Alaska is a TV series on the Smithsonian Channel about Ted Stevens Anchorage International Airport. A 6 episode first season premiered on November 15, 2020. On December 12, 2021, a second season was announced with a premiere date of January 9, 2022.

Premise
Ice Airport Alaska follows operations at Ted Stevens International Airport in Anchorage, Alaska one of the world's busiest cargo airports where staff work under harsh conditions with temperatures as low as -38 Celsius and winds over 100 mph.

Episodes

Series overview

Season 1 (2020)

Season 2 (2022)

Season 3 (2023)

See also
 Flying Wild Alaska, a TV show documenting life in an Alaska bush airline
 Ice Pilots NWT, a TV show documenting life in an NWT bush airline
 Arctic Air, a dramatic fiction TV show about airline operations in the arctic

References

External links
 
 
 

Aviation television series
Television shows set in Alaska
Smithsonian Channel original programming
Ted Stevens Anchorage International Airport
Anchorage, Alaska